Dill Mill Gayye ( Hearts Have Met) is an Indian medical drama television series that aired on Star One from 20 August 2007 to 29 October 2010. It was a sequel to the Star Plus series Sanjivani - A Medical Boon. The series is available digitally on Disney+ Hotstar.

The show focuses on a new generation of medical interns with the crux being the love story between Dr. Armaan Malik, portrayed by Karan Singh Grover and Dr. Riddhima Gupta which was originally portrayed by Shilpa Anand, who was later replaced by Sukirti Kandpal and then Jennifer Winget.

Plot

Season 1
The show follows the lives of surgical interns and resident doctors of Sanjeevani hospital. It deals with the pressures, drama, romance, interpersonal relationships and humour in their lives. At the start of the show, the interns are Dr Anjali Gupta, Dr Armaan Malik, Dr Riddhima Gupta, Dr Atul Joshi, and Dr Sapna Shah. Dr Shashank Gupta is the head of the hospital and the father of Anjali and Riddhima.

Initially, Armaan and Riddhima were at loggerheads. Anjali and Armaan become good friends, and Riddhima, Atul and Sapna become a good friend. A medical camp is arranged in a village where Armaan and Riddhima come closer towards each other. Slowly, they become friends. Riddhima learns that she is Nurse Padma's daughter and not Dr Shashank's real daughter. Anjali makes a bet with Armaan that Riddhima will fall for him. Riddhima learns about this. She is heartbroken. After few instances, they resolve their differences, and Riddhima finally confesses her love to Armaan. They are enjoying their togetherness.

Two new interns enter Dr Rahul Garewal and Dr Muskaan Chadda. Rahul and Armaan have a tashan between them. Muskaan likes Armaan and Rahul likes Riddhima. Meanwhile, Atul started liking Anjali and Sapna marries a patient. Rahul and Muskaan's family wants them to get married, but they don't want to. To get away from this situation, Muskaan receives help from Armaan without telling Riddhima about this. This leads to a separation between Armaan and Riddhima. Rahul now knows about them.

Nurse Padma and Dr Shashank wed. Dr Shubhanker likes Dr Keerti. Riddhima and Armaan become friends again, and eventually, they confess again, marking their togetherness. On the other side, Muskaan and Rahul develop feelings for each other. Dr Nikita Malhotra joins Sanjeevani. Nikita turns out to be Armaan's and Rahul's college friend secretly in love with Armaan. Dr Abhimanyu Modi enters Sanjeevani to save it from a financial crisis. He makes some decisions that the interns did not accept. They do non-cooperation movement and arrange a special show to collect funding. Dr Abhimanyu develops feelings for Dr Riddhima first. All the friends doubt that Armaan and Riddhima are together. So, they ask Nikita's help. But Nikita helps Armaan instead in keeping the secret, and they all think Armaan and Nikita have a scene instead of Riddhima. Armaan thinks of impressing Dr Shashank, disguising himself and changing his looks into a soft, straightforward person. Riddhima is pissed off because of this. Armaan arranges a particular date for her. Unfortunately, the police catch them, and everyone learns about them. No one allows them to meet each other. Armaan takes help from all their friends to persuade Dr Shashank and Anjali against their relationship. He starts living outside their house in a tent. The media started to publicise this matter. Finally, on Valentine's Day, Dr Shashank gives in due to Ridhhima's deteriorating health and accepts them, "Dr Love" gets his love, and Armaan Riddhima comes together. Their Roka is planned.

Armaan's family comes. Billy is very frank, which Dr Shashank doesn't like. Billy and Annie were separated, and Dr Shashank wants to dig out this matter. Armaan Riddhima started to have differences on this. Dr Keerti and Shubhanker wed. Bubbly, sister of Dr Shubhanker, is frank with Armaan, which Riddhima does not like. Due to Dr Abhimanyu and Bubbly, Armaan Riddhima have constant fights. One day, Armaan had an accident, and he lost his recent memory, including Riddhima. Riddhima is heartbroken. Armaan makes fun of her unknowingly that she is her life, Riddhima. Armaan has to rewrite the medical exam. She helps him. Both come closer. Friends try to tell Armaan how much he loved her. They both are together again. They are about to get engaged. On the day of engagement, a pregnant couple tries to hide in the hospital. Prominent politicians were involved in the case. Armaan and Riddhima are also stuck in the situation. In the last scene of the first season, Riddhima is shot, and she falls over Armaan, who hits a glass table. Atul is also shot. Dr Abhimanyu estranged wife, Jiah, returns.

Season 2
The show introduces five new interns: Dr Siddhant Modi, Dr Yuvraj Oberoi, Dr Naina Mehta, Dr Tamanna Patil, and Dr Jitendra Prasad. Dr Siddhant Modi falls in love with Tamanna, but the latter chooses to marry the person of her father's choice for his self-respect. Dr Shashank gets injured, and Riddhima comes back to Sanjivani. It is revealed that Armaan left her because of her spine injury due to the bullet because doctors thought she'll never be able to walk again. Eventually, she and Sid get into arguments and begin to hate each other. Riddhima learns that Armaan left her because of nerve damage that happened because he hit the glass table during the shootout. She feels guilty and goes in search of him, with Sid following, trying to protect her.
Due to misunderstandings regarding Sid and Riddhima's relationship, Dr Shashank all but presses her to marry him for her benefit. She tries to commit suicide on the wedding day but is saved by Sid. Sid and Riddhima decide to give their marriage a chance. Then they eventually shared some romantic moments until the return of Dr Armaan, who is heartbroken to learn about their marriage. Still, he tries to mend things between Sid and Riddhima and succeeds in doing so, no matter how much it hurts him. Dr Shilpa enters and falls in love with Dr Armaan. Dr Armaan cannot cope with the fact that he has lost his love and becomes gloomy. Dr Shilpa decides to sacrifice her love knowing that Dr Riddhima is her stepsister and Armaan still loves her deeply. Now Riddhima is in a dilemma between Armaan and Siddhant. Siddhant divorces Riddhima after realising that she can never love him. Riddhima eventually chooses Armaan, and the show ends with Riddhima singing a song for Armaan.

Cast and characters

Main
Karan Singh Grover as Dr. Armaan Malik – Intern and later senior resident doctor at Sanjeevani, Riddhima's love interest and Later Boyfriend. (2007-2010)
Shilpa Anand as Dr. Riddhima Gupta – Intern at Sanjeevani, daughter of Dr. Shashank and Padma Gupta, younger sister of Dr. Anjali and Armaan's love interest/girlfriend. (2007-2008)
Sukirti Kandpal as Dr. Riddhima Gupta – Intern, Armaan's girlfriend. (2008-2009) 
Jennifer Winget as Dr. Riddhima Gupta/Modi – Senior resident doctor at Sanjeevani and Dr. Siddhant's ex-wife, Armaan's girlfriend. (2009-2010)
Shilpa Anand as Dr. Shilpa Malhotra – Intern at Sanjeevani, Riddhima's half-sister (Kartik's daughter), loves Armaan but leaves him for Riddhima. (2010)
Karan Wahi as Dr. Siddhant Modi – Abhimanyu's younger brother. Likes Tamanna, Riddhima's ex-husband. (2009-2010)

Recurring
Mohnish Bahl as Dr. Shashank Gupta – Head of Sanjeevani hospital. Father of Anjali and Riddhima. Widower of Smriti; later marries Nurse Padma. (2007-2010)
Pankit Thakker as Dr. Atul Joshi – Dr. Omi's (Sanjeevani Season 1) adoptive son. Eco-friendly and lives with plants. Armaan's best friend and Anjali's love interest. (2007-2010)
Sunaina Gulia as Dr. Anjali Gupta – Riddhima's elder sister. Atul's love interest. (2007-2010) Anjali later appeared in Sanjivani, portrayed by Sayantani Ghosh. 
Sonia Singh as Dr. Kirti Mehra Rai – Sanjeevani's senior resident doctor. Shubhankar's love interest. Later, Shubhankar's wife. (2007-2010)
Ayaz Khan as Dr. Shubhankar Rai – Sanjeevani's senior resident doctor. Kirti's love interest & later, Kirti's husband, Navneeta's father. (2007-2010) 
Mayank Anand as Dr. Rahul Garewal – Intern, Friends with Armaan and Muskaan's love interest. (2007-2009)
Drashti Dhami as Dr Muskaan Chadda – Intern, Rahul's love interest. (2007-2009)
Amit Tandon as Dr. Abhimanyu Modi –Senior doctor in Sanjeevani. Nikita's love interest. (2008-2010)
Shweta Gulati as Dr. Nikita Malhotra – Loved Armaan since college days, but falls in love with Abhimanyu in Sanjeevani. (2008-2010)
Muskaan Mihani as Dr. Sapna Shah – Intern in Sanjeevani. Marries a patient Amit. (2007-2008)
Moulshree Sachdeva as Dr. Tamanna Patil – Siddhant's love interest, but becomes engaged to Aniket. (2009)
Neha Jhulka as Dr. Naina Mehta – Intern, Yuvraj's love interest. (2009-2010)
Sehban Azim as Dr. Yuvraj Oberoi – Intern, Naina's love interest. (2009-2010) 
Prasad Barve as Dr. Jitendra Prasad – Also known as JP. Intern in Sanjeevani. Close friends with Jiggy. (2009-2010)
Shilpa Tulaskar as Padma Bansal Gupta – Head nurse in Sanjeevani, Riddhima's real mother and Shashank's second wife. (2007-2008)
Ekta Sohini as Padma Bansal Gupta. (2009-2010)
Preeti Amin as Dr. Jiah Modi – Abhimanyu's first wife. A patient with mental illness who tries to separate Nikki and Abhimanyu. (2009)
Karan Paranjpe as Jignesh 'Jiggy – Naina's friend and later, male nurse in Sanjeevani. Also, close friends with JP. (2009-2010) 
Madhura Naik as Dr. Suvarna Modi – Siddhant and Abhimanyu's sister. Intern at Sanjeevani. (2010)
Barun Sobti as Dr. Raj Singh – A drug addict patient involved in a love triangle with Naina and Yuvraj. Later, intern at Sanjeevani. (2010)
Vinita Malik as Nani – Smriti's (Shashank's first wife in 'Sanjivani') mother. Riddhima and Anjali's grandmother. (2007-2009)
Mahesh Jadhav as Nana – Patient who gives valuable life lessons to Armaan and tries to bring Riddhima and Armaan together. Harbours a crush on Dr. Kirti. (2007-2010)
Swini Khara as Minnie – Patient in Sanjeevani. Armaan's mini 'girlfriend'. (2007/2009)
Aasif Sheikh as Balvinder "Billy" Mallik – Armaan's father, Ananya's husband. (2009-2010)
Meher Acharia Dar as Ananya "Annie" Mallik – Armaan's mother, Billy's wife. (2009)
Hemali Karpe as Lovely – Nurse at Sanjeevani. (2007-2010)
Iravati Harshe as Dr. Smriti Gupta – Anjali's mother, Riddhima's adopted mother and Dr. Shashank's late wife. (2007)
Upasana Singh – Abhimanyu, Siddhant and Suvarna's mother. (2010)
Shakti Arora as Sumit – Patient in Sanjeevani and loves Riddhima. (2007)
Deepali Pansare as Sumalatha Dalmiya – Dr. Abhimanyu's assistant. (2009)
Roopal Tyagi as Bubbly/Pari –Shubhankar's sister. (2009)
Kanika Maheshwari as Maya – Armaan's stalker. (2007)
Romanchak Arora as Aniket Joshi – Dr. Tamanna's fiance. (2009)
Jannat Zubair Rahmani as Tamanna – Patient in Sanjeevani. (2010)
Suhail More as Gappu – Patient in Sanjeevani. (2008-2009)

Guest appearances
Mohit Malik (2008)
Crossover with Miley Jab Hum Tum
Sanaya Irani - as Gunjan
Arjun Bijlani - as Mayank
Mohit Sehgal - as Samraat
Rati Pandey - as Nupur
Navina Bole - as Dia, Siddhant's friend
Anupriya Kapoor - as Suhani
Nishant Singh Malkani - as Adhiraj Singh
Jaineeraj Rajpurohit - as Mr Saxena
Deepak Pareek - as Professor Shukla

Series overview

Production

Development
After the end of Sanjeevani - a medical boon, Siddharth Malhotra decided to make Dill Mill Gayye as a sequel of the show.The actor Mohnish Bahl reprised his role of Dr. Shashank from Sanjeevani and was the only common link between the shows.

In an Interview with Times of India, Pankit Thakker talked about three actresses playing the role of Dr. Riddhima Gupta and stated that:

Casting
Earlier, Haroon Qazi was cast as Dr. Armaan but due to creative difference he was replaced with Karan Singh Grover. Karan Singh Grover and Shilpa Anand played the main characters Dr. Armaan and Dr. Riddhima.

Shilpa Anand initially gave audition for the role of Dr. Anjali Gupta. When her look test was done for a promo with Karan Singh Grover, their on screen chemistry made the creative team's mind change, Immediately. Later Sunaina Gulia was signed for the role. Pankit Thakker was originally paired up with Muskaan Mihani. But he believed his chemistry with Muskaan was mostly coming out friendly. Hence, he discussed with the creative directors if they could change the track so they'd paired him up with Sunaina.

In May 2008, Shilpa Anand quit the show owing to the differences between the production house and to pursue a career in Bollywood. She was replaced by Sukirti Kandpal who quit the show in 2009 and was replaced by Jennifer Winget.

In 2009, Mayank Anand quit Dill Mill Gayye to pursue his career as book writer, later in October Karan Singh Grover also quit the show. Nearing the end of September 2009, the whole cast was changed and a second season was introduced with five new actors - Karan Wahi, Moulshree Sachdeva, Sehban Azim, Neha Jhulka and Prasad Barve.

In 2010, Karan Singh Grover and Shilpa Anand both actors returned to the show on fans' demands, and Anand played different character - Dr. Shilpa Malhotra and once again she was paired opposite Karan Singh Grover.

Filming
In 2008, during shoot of a basketball playing scene actress Shilpa Anand began feeling unwell and almost passed out on the set due to over heat, but she continued shooting.

Special scenes
The series had shot many scenes which resemble some of the scenes from Bollywood. "The aur pass" scene and Lonavala sequence between Karan Singh Grover and Shilpa Anand were inspired from Bollywood film Dil Toh Pagal Hai.

Reception

Critics
The Times of India reported that Dill Mill Gayye was a TRP-tripper when Karan Singh Grover and Shilpa Anand played Dr. Armaan and Dr. Riddhima and also stated that their sizzling on-screen chemistry took the show to new highs. In 2012, They listed Karan Singh Grover among "Big icons of small screen" and stated that he was a huge teenage icon in 2007 and even one and half year after the show's off air, there were demands for another season.

Shweta Ksheri of India Today wrote, "With a fresh cast and a new storyline, the romantic medical drama was successful in attracting the younger lot."

Ratings
It was no.1 show of Star One in 2007 to 2008. In January 2008, it entered in top Hindi GEC list garnering 2.47 TRP. These TRPS occurred when the character Riddhima confessed her love to Armaan.

Controversy
In 2007, The Times of India reported that gang of girls on the sets of Dill Mill Gayye decided to stay away from Karan Singh Grover because of his compulsive flirting. In an exclusive Interview with "Spotboye", Shilpa Anand revealed that she quit the show in 2008 because she had a fight with the executive producer during shoot of "Zara Zara Touch Me Touch Me" dance sequence. Her replacement wasn’t well accepted by audience and her exit caused a sizeable drop in the ratings.

In 2009, when Sukirti Kandpal had quit the show, the producer Siddharth Malhotra approached Shilpa Anand for returning to Dill Mill Gayye but she asked for high amount of money which caused a conflict between her and the producer. Cinevistaas Limited stated that they had lodged a complaint against Karan Singh Grover for routinely reporting hours late for work, which made them incur a loss and also actress Jennifer Winget slapped him on the set. They didn't speak to each other for months, used to shoot for their scenes separately at two different times. In 2010, a rumor spread that the rest of the three actors - Karan Singh Grover, Karan Wahi and Jennifer Winget were unhappy about the focus getting shifted to Dr. Shilpa Malhotra.

Soundtrack

Background musics by Raju Singh

Awards and nominations

References

External links

 Dill Mill Gayye on Hotstar

2007 Indian television series debuts
2010 Indian television series endings
Star One (Indian TV channel) original programming
Indian television soap operas
Indian medical television series
Serial drama television series
Sequel television series
Indian romance television series